Kerala Congress (Joseph) or Kerala Congress or Joseph Group is a political party in the Indian state of Kerala. It was formed in 1964. Kerala Congress (Joseph) was the brakeless fraction of Kerala Congress Party  By election commission (1964-2010) and (2021–Present)

After the Split in Kerala Congress on 1979 Media Started to Address as  Kerala Congress (Joseph) Or Kerala Congress (J) to avoid confusion between These Parties .

History 
Kerala Congress (J)  Also known as Kerala Congress (Joseph) is a fraction of the Kerala Congress Led by P. J. Joseph. After the split in 1979, Kerala news media started call bracket less Kerala Congress party as Kerala Congress (Joseph)

Reunited  (1985)
In 1985 Kerala congress leaders K. M. Mani (from Kerala Congress (M))  and R. Balakrishna Pillai (from Kerala Congress (B))  merged with Kerala Congress to form a united Kerala Congress

Split Again(1987 and 1989)
In 1987 K.M Mani left Kerala Congress And revived His Fraction Known as Kerala Congress (Mani). and In 1989 R. Balakrishna Pillai  Left Kerala Congress And  Revived Kerala Congress (B)

P. J. Joseph continued in United Democratic Front (UDF) till 1989. Issue raised in Moovattupuzha loksabha seat joseph left the alliance and joined to LDF. Since 1991 Joseph's party became part of the Left Democratic Front (LDF) as an alliance.

Merger With Kerala Congress (M) (2010) 
In 2010 Joseph Group has merged with Kerala Congress (M). However, a fraction led by P.C Thomas did not support this merger, Fraction of P.C Thomas Formed Kerala Congress (Anti-merger Group) and Stayed in LDF. 
For the 2011 Kerala Assembly elections, both P. J. Joseph and P. C. Thomas claimed that their respective factions were entitled to the original party, but the election commission froze the claims and directed the followers of Joseph to contest under the name of the Kerala Congress (M) to which it had united, and the followers of Thomas to contest under the name Kerala Congress (Anti-merger Group). which ultimately dissolved bracket less Kerala Congress party (from 2011-2016)
In 2016 P.C Thomas revived the Kerala congress party.so his fraction of bracketless  Kerala Congress party called by the media as Kerala Congress (Thomas)

Revival of Kerala Congress (Joseph) or Joseph Group (split) (2019)
After the death of  K.M Mani back in April 2019 his son and a group of his followers tried to take over party control which caused to form another Group Lead by another Senior leader P.J Joseph

In 2019 June, the media declared as  P. J. Joseph and C. F. Thomas revived Kerala Congress (J) by splitting from Kerala Congress (M)

In July Both groups announced a split and claimed for party symbol and the name 
the faction led by Jose K. Mani was expelled from the UDF for not vacating the presidency of the Kottayam district panchayat for the faction led by P. J. Joseph. Following this, Jose announced the intention of his faction to join the LDF in October 2020.

Re-joining to Kerala Congress (2021)
Since 1979 P.J Joseph was the chairman of the bracketless Kerala Congress party. By 2011 Election Commission of India froze Kerala congress Party name and symbol ultimately resulted as Kerala Congress Party dissolved. However, in 2016 P.C Thomas was revived Kerala Congress Party. so after the recent events happened Kerala Congress (M), in 2021 February PJ Joseph and his followers officially left Kerala Congress (M).

on 17 March 2021, P. C. Thomas announced that his party Kerala Congress  has merged with the Joseph faction of Kerala Congress (m) with him being its Deputy Chairman. and P.J Joseph became party chairman.

It Was Also Marked as  P.J Joseph's return to the Parent Kerala Congress Party as Chairman after 11 years.

Leadership (till 2010)
 P. J. Joseph  -  Founder and Chairman
 Monce Joseph
 K. Francis George
 T.U. Kuruvila

References

Kerala Congress Parties
State political parties in Kerala
1979 establishments in Kerala
Political parties established in 1979